The Garneau River is a tributary of the Turgeon River flowing in Canada in:
Cochrane District, Northeastern Ontario;
Nord-du-Québec, in Jamésie, in the municipality of Eeyou Istchee Baie-James (municipality) in the township of Récher.

The surface of the river is usually frozen from early from November to mid-May, but safe circulation on the ice generally occurs from mid-November to the end of April.

Geography 
The main watersheds adjacent to the Garneau River are:
North side: Kaokonimawaga Creek, Detour River, Turgeon River;
East side: Makwo Creek, Wijinawi Creek, Theo River, Wawagosic River;
South side: Adimoskadjiwi Creek, Turcotte River, Turgeon River;
West side: Turcotte River, Little Turcotte River (Ontario).

The Garneau River originates at the mouth of a lake Garneau, in Cochrane District, in Ontario.

The mouth of Lake Garneau is located at:
 at west of the boundary between Ontario and Quebec;
 at southeast of the mouth of the Garneau River;
 at south of the mouth of the Turgeon River (in Quebec);
 at southeast of a southern bay of Kesagami Lake (in Ontario).

From its source, the Garneau River flows on  according to the following segments:
 southwest by crossing marsh areas to the boundary between Quebec and Ontario;
 in Québec including  to the south-east in the swamp area, then  to the East, to a stream (coming from the South);
 to Nord-East in swamp area, up to the mouth.

The Garneau River flows to the southwest bank of the Turgeon River. This confluence is located at:
 at southwest of the mouth of the Turgeon River (confluence with the Harricana River);
 at east of the boundary between Quebec and Ontario;
 at west of the center of the village of Joutel, Quebec, in Quebec;
 at north of the city center of La Sarre, Quebec, in Quebec.

Toponymy 
The term "Garneau" is a surname of a family of French origin.

The name "rivière Garneau" was officially registered on December 5, 1968, at the Commission de toponymie du Québec, at the creation of this commission.

See also 
Cochrane District, an administrative district of Ontario
Northeastern Ontario
Eeyou Istchee Baie-James (municipality)
Turgeon River, a watercourse
Harricana River, a watercourse
James Bay, a body of water
List of rivers of Ontario
List of rivers of Quebec

References

External links 

Rivers of Cochrane District
Rivers of Nord-du-Québec